Glamour (stylized in all caps) is today an online women's magazine published by Condé Nast Publications. For many years a traditional hard-copy magazine, it was founded in 1939 and first published in April 1939 in the United States. It was originally called Glamour of Hollywood.

History
In August 1943, the magazine changed its name to Glamour, with the subtitle for the girl with the job. The magazine was published in a larger format than many of its contemporaries. Charm, a Street & Smith magazine, started in 1941, later subtitled "the magazine for women who work", was folded into Glamour magazine  in 1959.

Glamour targets women 18–49 (with the median age of 33.5) and reaches a subscription audience of 1,411,061 readers in the United States. Its circulation on newsstands was 986,447, making the total average paid circulation 2,397,508.

Glamour was the first women's magazine to feature an African-American cover girl when it included Katiti Kironde on the cover of its college issue in August 1968.

Since 1990, the magazine has held an annual "Women of the Year" awards ceremony.

On January 8, 2018, it was announced that Samantha Barry, previously the Head of Social Media and Emerging Media at CNN, would be the new Editor-in-Chief of Glamour.

In November 2018, Glamour announced that its print edition would cease with its January 2019 issue in order to focus on its digital presence.

Glamour Top College Women Awards 
Each year for the last 56 years, the magazine has been selecting a top ten list of outstanding college women across the country. Originally, the list was composed of the best dressed college juniors in America, but was changed for more substance with categories such as academic achievement, community service, and career goals as leading criteria. Hundreds of college juniors apply each year. Past winners, finalists include; Martha Stewart, Diane Sawyer, Swati Mia Saini,  Nancy Amanda Redd, 2003 Miss Virginia (MAO) and author of Body Drama, and Tamira A. Cole, Miss Black Kentucky USA 2009 and author of HUSH, actress Sheryl Lee Ralph and novelists Curtis Sittenfeld, Kate White, Janice Kaplan, Olympians Allison Schmitt, Julie Johnston, and Nzingha Prescod, Grace Kelly, and Jean Hanff Korelitz.

Glamour Woman of the Year Awards
Each autumn, the magazine organizes the “Glamour Woman of the Year Awards” which recognize women in the public eye.
In 2007, Lorena Ochoa won a Woman of the Year award. In 2008 the award was granted to two Yemenis: 10-year-old divorcee Nujood Ali, and the lawyer who took on her case. Nujood's courage was praised by prominent attendees, including Hillary Clinton and Condoleezza Rice. The 2010 Glamour Woman of the Year was Cher and the 2016 Glamour Woman of the Year was Zendaya

International editions

Glamour launched in the UK in April 2001, where it pioneered the “handbag size” format, with the tagline "fits in your life as well as your handbag".  Each September, the magazine held “National Glamour Week”, when it featured extra coupons and competitions. In 2016, Glamour UK launched the Glamour Beauty Festival, on a new off-page beauty event featuring demonstrations, treatments and speakers.

From its launch to the final traditional issue in November 2017, the magazine was edited by Jo Elvin, with Michelle Pamment serving as acting editor briefly in 2005. In June 2009, to celebrate Glamours eighth birthday in the UK, Glamour.com made a gallery of every cover since its launch. In October 2017, following declining sales, it was announced that publication of the monthly UK edition would end at the end of 2017, and that the UK version would be a semi-annual publication. In November 2017, Deborah Joseph was appointed Chief Content Officer of Glamour UK.

The Italian edition of Glamour was launched in December 1976, under the title Lei (She), then officially renamed Glamour, like its U.S. counterpart, in 1992.

The Russian edition was established in 2004, and is published monthly.

The South African edition launched in April 2004 and is published monthly.

Glamour is also published in Germany, Spain, Mexico, Poland, Hungary, France, Russia, Sweden, Brazil, Turkey, Greece, Israel,  the Netherlands, Romania and Bulgaria. There is also a third Spanish edition, published in the Spanish-speaking countries of Latin America.

Editors of international editions

Lucky magazine
In Germany and Greece Lucky, a fashion and shopping magazine is published seasonally, in tandem with Glamour.
Lucky magazine is being shut down.

Reference in pop culture
A copy of it was the magazine to which George Costanza (Jason Alexander) masturbated on the series Seinfeld, when he was caught by his mother in the season 4 episode "The Contest".

See also
 Helen Valentine, founder and editor-in-chief, Charm magazine
 Cipe Pineles, Charm magazine art director
 Picture Play (magazine)
 Glamour (presentation)
 Glamour model

References

Further reading 
 
 
  
 
 Lizzie Bramlett. Charm magazine — The Vintage Traveler

External links
 Official website of Glamour TV
 Official website (US)
 Official website (UK)
 Official website (Italy)
 Official website (Germany)
 Official website (France) 
 Official website (Russia)
 Official Website (Mexico)
 Official Website (Spain)
 Official Website (Greece)
 Official Website (South Africa)
 Official Website (Poland)
 Official Website (Hungary)
 Official Website (Netherlands)
 Official Website (Sweden)
 Website GlamYou

1939 establishments in the United States
2019 disestablishments in the United States
Condé Nast magazines
Defunct women's magazines published in the United States
Fashion magazines published in the United States
Magazines established in 1939
Magazines disestablished in 2019
Monthly magazines published in the United States
Women's fashion magazines
Online magazines published in the United States
Online magazines with defunct print editions